Veera Hiranandani is an American writer of children's books. Her novel The Night Diary received a Newbery Honor in 2019.

Life and Work 
Hiranandani, the daughter of a Jewish mother and a father who was originally from India, was raised in Connecticut. She attended George Washington University, and later studied fiction writing at Sarah Lawrence College.lf a Girl, was published in 2012. It would become a Sydney Taylor Notable Book and a South Asian Book Award Finalist.

Hiranandani's next novel, The Night Diary'', is set against the background of the 1947 Partition of India. She stated that this book was partly inspired by the experiences of her father, who was nine at the time of the Partition, and fled his home with his family. The book would be named one of two Newbery Honor titles in 2019.

Hiranandani lives and works in New York state.

References 

 

21st-century American novelists
Newbery Honor winners
Living people
Year of birth missing (living people)
Place of birth missing (living people)